Raphiophoridae is a family of small to average-sized trilobites that first occurred at the start of the Ordovician and became extinct at the end of the Middle Silurian.

Anatomy 
All raphiophorids are blind, with headshields (or cephalons) that are triangular to subcircular, and many carry long, trailing genal spines, a forward-directed rapier-like spine on the central raised area (or glabella), or both, with the glabella often inflated and the natural fracture lines (or sutures) of the cephalon coinciding with its margin. The thorax typically has five to seven segments (except for the genera Taklamakania, Pseudampyxina, Nanshanaspis, and Kongqiangheia, which have only 3).  As mentioned before, all raphiophorids are blind.  Many, if not most, genera have no eyes whatsoever, though a few, such as Lehnertia, have vestigial tubercles that correspond to the compound eyes of their ancestors.

Distribution 
Raphiophoridae currently includes two officially recognized subfamilies. The nominal subfamily Raphiophorinae originated from the Upper Tremadocian and died out during the Lower Ludlow, and has 217 species assigned to it divided over 26 genera. The subfamily Endymioniinae occurred from the Floian or possibly from the Lower Tremadocian to the Upper Katian and contains 36 species in 13 genera. The time of the first occurrence depends on whether the inadequately known monotypic genus Typhlokorynetes from the Lower Tremadocian of Laurentia is considered an endymioniin. Raphiophorids are generally 
found in deep-water sediments, and have a cosmopolitan distribution from the Floian to the Ordovician–Silurian extinction events with diversity peaking from the Darriwilian to the Sandbian. Raphiophorus survived into the Silurian.

Taxonomy 
The subfamily Taklamakaniinae was erected to bring together the genera Nanshanaspis, Pseudampyxina, and Taklamakania, (and then, later, Kongqiangheia) on the basis that they all have only three thoracic segments. Analysis of adult anatomy of these genera and larval stages of other raphiophorids showed they most probably developed through paedomorphosis from three different ancestors, so provide an example of parallel evolution. Nanshanaspis closely resembles young Globampyx, Pseudampyxina strongly looks like juvenile Raymondella, and Taklamakania is almost identical to early stages of Ampyxina. Since the three genera of the Taklamakaniinae have been demonstrated to be unrelated to each other, this subfamily is regarded as polyphyletic, and has been synonymized with the Raphiophorinae.

Genera  
These genera are assigned to the Raphiophoridae:

Subfamily Raphiophorinae 
 Raphiophorus Angelin, 1854
 Ampyx Dalman, 1827 
 Ampyxella Dean, 1960 
 Ampyxina Ulrich, 1922
 Ampyxoides Whittington, 1965
 Bulbaspis Chugaeva, 1956
 Cnemidopyge Whittard, 1955
 Edmundsonia Cooper, 1953
 Globampyx Fortey, 1975
 Kongqiangheia
 Lonchodomas Angelin, 1854
 Mendolaspis Rusconi, 1951
 Nanshanaspis Chang & Fan, 1960
 Pseudampyxina Ju, 1983
 Raymondella Reed, 1935
 Rhombampyx Fortey, 1975
 Taklamakania Zhang, 1980

Subfamily Endymioniinae
 Endymionia Billings, 1865 
 Ampyxinella Koroleva, 1959
 Ampyxinops Zhang 1979
 Anisonotella Whittington, 1965
 Carinocranium Dean, 1989
 Edmundsonia Cooper 1953
 Jiuxiella Zhou et al. 1977
 Lehnertia Vaccari, et al, 2006
 Malongullia Webby, Moors & McLean, 1970
 Miaopopsis Lu et al. 1965, synonym = Sinampyxina
 Miboshania Zhang 1979
 Pytine Fortey, 1975
 Salteria Thomson, 1864
? Tarimella W. T. Zhang 1979 (may be a shumardiid ptychopariid)
 Typhlokorynetes Shaw, 1966

References

 
Trinucleioidea
Trilobite families
Ordovician trilobites
Silurian trilobites
Early Ordovician first appearances
Silurian extinctions